Hatch's Mill was a short-lived Canadian comedy television show that aired on CBC Television in 1967.

Premise
This filmed comedy series was among CBC Television's first colour productions. It was set in the 1830s and portrayed the life of the Hatch family members who were settlers in what is now southern Ontario. Patriarch Noah Hatch (Robert Christie) owned a mill and a general store in addition to his duties as his community's judge. His family includes wife Maggie (Cosette Lee) with children Saul (Marc Strange) and Silence (Sylvia Feigel).

Hatch's Mill was produced as a Canadian Centennial project. It was not renewed beyond its 10-episode run.

Filming location
 The show was filmed at Kleinburg, Ontario. Outdoor sets were built alongside older buildings used two years prior on The Forest Rangers.

Cast
 Robert Christie - Noah Hatch
 Sylvia Feigel - Silence Hatch
 Cosette Lee - Maggie Hatch
 Marc Strange - Saul Hatch
 Chris Wiggins - Donegan

References

External links
 
 

1967 Canadian television series debuts
1967 Canadian television series endings
CBC Television original programming
1960s Canadian sitcoms
Television shows filmed in Ontario